Emmanuel Michon (born 9 May 1955) is a former ice speed skater from France, who represented his native country at two consecutive Winter Olympics, starting in 1976 in Innsbruck, Austria.
He skated also at the first Olympics in short track speed skating in Calgary [1988]. He was the national short track speed skating coach in Albertville [1992] and Lillehamer [1994].

References

External links
 SkateResults

1955 births
Living people
French male speed skaters
Speed skating coaches
Speed skaters at the 1976 Winter Olympics
Speed skaters at the 1980 Winter Olympics
Olympic speed skaters of France
Place of birth missing (living people)